Neopentylamine is an organic compound with the molecular formula (CH3)3CCH2NH2. It is a colorless liquid. The molecule is the primary amine derivative of neopentane, (CH3)4C. 

Like most alkyl amines, it degrades slowly in air.

Synthesis 
Neopentylamine is prepared by the reaction neopentanol with ammonia.

Use 
It is a common building block. For example, some experimental drugs incorporate this amine.

References 

Amines